Burckhalter may refer to:
3447 Burckhalter, an asteroid
Joseph H. Burckhalter (1912–2004), American chemist

See also
Burkhalter (disambiguation)